Blake Hardwick (born 5 February 1997) is a professional Australian rules footballer playing for the Hawthorn Football Club in the Australian Football League (AFL). He grew up in Mitcham attending Nunawading Primary School and Mullauna Secondary College.

Early career 

Hardwick was the leading goal kicker in the 2015 TAC Cup season, and kicked twelve, ten and eight goals against the Bendigo Pioneers, Geelong Falcons and Western Jets respectively. He was drafted by the Hawthorn Football Club with their third selection and forty-fourth overall in the 2015 national draft.

AFL career 

He made his debut in the nineteen point win against  in round 19, 2016 at Aurora Stadium in Launceston, he recorded eight disposals and kicked a behind.

Hardwick earned a Rising Star nomination in Round 15, 2017 after a string of solid performances.

On August 14, 2017, Hardwick signed a two-year contract extension keeping him at Hawthorn until the end of 2019.

Entering into his third season, Hardwick's guernsey number was changed from 37 to the 15 previously worn by Luke Hodge following the latter's move to Brisbane at the end of the 2017 season.

He played every game of the 2018 AFL season kicking his first goal at AFL level and finishing second in Hawthorn's best and fairest award, the Peter Crimmins Medal behind 2018 Brownlow medallist, Tom Mitchell.

In 2021 Hardwick played his 100th career game for Hawthorn. He once again finished runner up in the Peter Crimmins medal behind Tom Mitchell.

Statistics
Updated to the end of the 2022 season.

|-
| 2016 ||  || 37
| 1 || 0 || 1 || 5 || 3 || 8 || 1 || 3 || 0.0 || 1.0 || 5.0 || 3.0 || 8.0 || 1.0 || 3.0 || 0
|-
| 2017 ||  || 37
| 19 || 0 || 1 || 160 || 114 || 274 || 89 || 53 || 0.0 || 0.1 || 8.4 || 6.0 || 14.4 || 4.7 || 2.8 || 0
|-
| 2018 ||  || 15
| 24 || 3 || 1 || 219 || 175 || 394 || 107 || 57 || 0.1 || 0.0 || 9.1 || 7.3 || 16.4 || 4.5 || 2.4 || 0
|-
| 2019 ||  || 15
| 22 || 2 || 2 || 258 || 124 || 382 || 99 || 69 || 0.1 || 0.1 || 11.7 || 5.6 || 17.4 || 4.5 || 3.1 || 0
|-
| 2020 ||  || 15
| 16 || 1 || 0 || 139 || 67 || 206 || 45 || 21 || 0.1 || 0.0 || 8.7 || 4.2 || 12.9 || 2.8 || 1.3 || 0
|-
| 2021 ||  || 15
| 20 || 0 || 2 || 312 || 106 || 418 || 108 || 41 || 0.0 || 0.1 || 15.6 || 5.3 || 20.9 || 5.4 || 2.1 || 0
|-
| 2022 ||  || 15
| 22 || 0 || 0 || 267 || 99 || 366 || 114 || 42 || 0.0 || 0.0 || 12.1 || 4.5 || 16.6 || 5.2 || 1.9 || 0
|- class="sortbottom"
! colspan=3| Career
! 124 !! 6 !! 7 !! 1360 !! 688 !! 2048 !! 563 !! 286 !! 0.0 !! 0.1 !! 11.0 !! 5.5 !! 16.5 !! 4.5 !! 2.3 || 0
|}

Notes

Honours and achievements
Individual
  leading goalkicker: 2016
  most courageous player: 2022
  most promising player: 2018
 AFL Rising Star nominee: 2017

References

External links

1997 births
Living people
Hawthorn Football Club players
Eastern Ranges players
Box Hill Football Club players
Australian rules footballers from Melbourne
People from Mitcham, Victoria